The men's 60 kg weightlifting event was one of the events at the weightlifting competition of the 1988 Summer Olympics, limiting competitors to a maximum of 60 kilograms of body mass. The competition took place on 20 September, and participants were divided in two groups.

Each lifter performed in both the snatch and clean and jerk lifts, with the final score being the sum of the lifter's best result in each. The athlete received three attempts in each of the two lifts; the score for the lift was the heaviest weight successfully lifted.

Naim Süleymanoğlu, who previously competed for Bulgaria under the name Naum Shalamanov, competed for the first time in the Olympics as a Turkish citizen after Bulgarian government received money to allow him to compete.

Results

References

Sources

Weightlifting at the 1988 Summer Olympics